Kaden Nelson Smith (born April 24, 1997) is an American football tight end who is a free agent. He played college football at Stanford.

Early years
Smith attended Edward S. Marcus High School in Flower Mound, Texas. During his career he had 144 career receptions for 2,260 yards. He committed to Stanford University to play college football.

College career
After redshirting his first year at Stanford in 2016, Smith played had 23 receptions for 414 yards and five touchdowns in 2017. In 2018, he was a finalist for the John Mackey Award. On January 1, 2019, Smith announced that he would forgo his senior season and declare for the 2019 NFL Draft.

Professional career

San Francisco 49ers
Smith was drafted by the San Francisco 49ers in the sixth round, 176th overall, of the 2019 NFL Draft. He was waived on September 14, 2019.

New York Giants

On September 16, 2019, Smith was claimed off of waivers by the New York Giants. During the Week 12 matchup against the Chicago Bears, Smith made his first-career start in his fourth game and recorded his first touchdown in the NFL in the 19–14 loss. In week 16 against the Washington Redskins, Smith caught 6 passes for 35 yards and 2 touchdowns, including the game winner in overtime, during the 41–35 win.

Smith was placed on the reserve/COVID-19 list by the team on November 20, 2020, and activated on December 1.

On December 3, 2021, Smith was placed on injured reserve.

On March 11, 2022, Smith was waived after failing a physical.

NFL Career Statistics

References

External links
 
 Stanford Cardinal profile

1997 births
Living people
American football tight ends
New York Giants players
People from Flower Mound, Texas
Players of American football from Texas
San Francisco 49ers players
Sportspeople from the Dallas–Fort Worth metroplex
Stanford Cardinal football players